Ponte de Portas de Ródão is a bridge in Portugal. It is located in Castelo Branco District and crosses the Tejo River.

See also
List of bridges in Portugal

Bridges in Portugal
Bridges in Castelo Branco District
1888 establishments in Portugal
Bridges over the Tagus